Jonathan Baker (born 20 December 1959) is a former British racing driver.

See also
Motorsport in the United Kingdom

References

1959 births
Living people
British racing drivers
24 Hours of Le Mans drivers
Place of birth missing (living people)
20th-century British people